Björn Gelotte (born 27 August 1975) is a Swedish musician and songwriter, best known as the lead guitarist for heavy metal band In Flames. He originally joined the band as the drummer in 1995, and continued in this position during The Jester Race (1996) and Whoracle (1997). He switched to his current position on lead guitar after Glenn Ljungström left the band and played solely guitars since Colony  (1999), sharing lead/rhythm guitar work with former In Flames guitarist Jesper Strömblad.

In March 2004, Gelotte and Strömblad were both ranked No. 70 out of 100 Greatest Heavy Metal Guitarists of all time by Guitar World.

Other projects
Before joining In Flames, Gelotte was a member of Flesh of Sights.

He is currently involved in a side project called All Ends, which he and his former In Flames bandmate Jesper Strömblad write the songs for.  Björn's sister is one of the singers for All Ends.  Neither of them plan to play in the side project live due to In Flames' demanding schedule. He also played guitar on the track "Self Versus Self" by UK/Australian drum and bass act Pendulum, along with his bandmates Anders Fridén and Peter Iwers.

Gelotte did several guest appearances, contributing a guitar solo on the track "Letters From Neverend", from the album Schlacht by the band Avatar, and performing lead guitar for the song "Force of Hand", from the album Atoma by the band Dark Tranquillity.

Equipment
Gelotte uses a Gibson Les Paul Custom and a custom shop Les Paul, both with EMG 81 (bridge) and EMG 85 (neck) active pickups. The custom shop Les Paul has a few changes to the stock model, such as inlay blocks similar to the Les Paul Supreme. He uses a POD XT and other Line 6 equipment, Dunlop custom strings, and Dunlop .88 MM Tortex picks.  On In Flames' albums up to Whoracle, both Björn and co-guitarist Jesper Strömblad exclusively tuned their guitars to C standard.  From Colony to Reroute to Remain, In Flames started using Drop A# tuning, on some of the tracks, and on all albums since Soundtrack to Your Escape, In Flames have been using drop A# tuning exclusively. An exception to this, however, is seen on Reroute to Remain, where Björn and Jesper tune their guitars to drop G on the track "Transparent".

In 2015, Epiphone announced the release of a limited edition Björn Gelotte signature Les Paul Custom. It has a mahogany body and neck, ebony fretboard with pearl block inlays, ebony gloss finish, and gold hardware. This model has a thicker "custom '59" neck profile and includes such premium features as Grover tuning machines, gold covered EMG 81 and 85 active pickups, and comes with a hardshell case with custom screen printing. The headstock inlay is a stylized version of the In Flames "jester head" logo.

Guitars:
 Gibson Les Paul Custom
 Epiphone Signature Les Paul Custom
 ESP Eclipse
Amps
 Marshall JVM 410H
 Peavey 5150
 EVH 5150 III
 Mesa Boogie Dual Rectifier
FX
 Line 6 Pod XT
misc
 Dunlop strings Custom wound .12, .16, .22, .38, .52, .68 gauge strings (Gelotte's strings have a coating over them because he is allergic to nickel)
 Dunlop .88 MM Tortex picks
 Dunlop Ultex Sharp Picks

References

External links

 In Flames' official website
 Ferret Music' In Flames pages
 Nuclear Blast' In Flames pages

1975 births
21st-century drummers
21st-century guitarists
In Flames members
Lead guitarists
Living people
Pendulum (drum and bass band) members
People from Gothenburg
Swedish heavy metal drummers
Swedish heavy metal guitarists
Swedish multi-instrumentalists